Attera Totus Sanctus (intended Latin translation of "Destroy All the Holy") is Dark Funeral's fourth full-length studio album. It was released on October 24, 2005, in Europe through Regain Records, and on November 29, 2005, in the United States through Candlelight Records USA. The title was chosen to convey the band's vehement anti–right-hand path  stance. Attera Totus Sanctus is the first album to feature guitarist Chaq Mol and the last album to feature drummer Matte Modin and also features session bassist Gustaf Hielm.

Track listing

Personnel

Dark Funeral
 Lord Ahriman – lead guitar
 Emperor Magus Caligula – vocals
 Matte Modin – drums
 Chaq Mol – rhythm guitar
Additional Personnel
 Gustaf Hielm – bass

Production
 Daniel Bergstrand – mixing
 Örjan Örnkloo – mixing
 Tomas Eberger – mastering
 Daniel "Morbid" Valeriani – cover design and artwork, layout
 Erik Sjolander – photography

Charts

References

External links 
 Lyrics at official website

2005 albums
Dark Funeral albums
Regain Records albums